The Ariel Hotel is a circular hotel very close to London Heathrow Airport.

The hotel was built for J. Lyons and Co. in 1960, and designed by Russell Diplock & Associates. It was "Britain’s first significant airport hotel", and the first hotel to be built at Heathrow Airport, its completion being timed to coincide with the opening of the Oceanic Terminal (now Terminal 3). It was opened by Queen Elizabeth II on 16 December 1960.

It was built with 185 rooms, and its doughnut design allows it to offer dedicated single-bed rooms around the inside ring, an unusual feature among Heathrow hotels.

It was acquired in 1978 by the Forte Group as a Posthouse, and in 2001 it was bought by Bass/Six Continents which became the InterContinental Hotels Group (IHG) which put it in their Holiday Inn brand. After a couple of ownership changes, in 2015 the hotel was managed by the Redefine BDL Hotels (RBH) group who continued to run it as a Holiday Inn franchise. As of 2023 the hotel operates under the Best Western brand to which it transferred around 2021. It is advertised as having 184 rooms.

On 15 February 2020, the hotel became a temporary quarantine centre during the COVID-19 pandemic and was closed to the general public for around a month.

As of February 2023, the website is not accepting bookings from March to September 2023. No explanation is provided.

References

External links
 Official site

Hotels in London
Buildings and structures in the London Borough of Hillingdon
Buildings and structures at Heathrow Airport
Hotels established in 1960
Hotel buildings completed in 1960